Myklebostad is a village in Tjeldsund Municipality in Troms og Finnmark county, Norway. The village is located along the Ofotfjorden on the southern shore of Tjeldøya island.

References

Tjeldsund
Villages in Troms